Pseudacrobasis is a genus of snout moths.

Species 
Pseudacrobasis dilatata Ren & Li, 2016 (from China)
Pseudacrobasis tergestella (Ragonot, 1901) (jr.syn. Pseudacrobasis nankingella Roesler, 1975) (from Europe, Japan, China, Korea, Russia)

References

Scalercio & Smamka, 2016. Wrong taxonomy leads to a wrong conclusion on a putatively ‘invasive’ species to Europe: the case of Pseudacrobasis nankingella (Lepidoptera Pyralidae). - Redia Journal of Zoology (98) 

Phycitini
Moths of Asia
Moths of Europe
Pyralidae genera